Clastoneuriopsis is a genus of bristle flies in the family Tachinidae. There are at least two described species in Clastoneuriopsis.

Species
These two species belong to the genus Clastoneuriopsis:
 Clastoneuriopsis magallanica Cortes, 1986
 Clastoneuriopsis meralis Reinhard, 1939

References

Further reading

External links

 
 

Tachininae